Pret A Manger  (prêt à manger is French for ready to eat) is a British sandwich shop franchise chain headquartered in London, United Kingdom, popularly referred to as Pret, founded in 1983. As of December 2022, Pret had 434 shops in the UK, including 273 in London, plus three "Veggie Prets", which focus exclusively on vegetarian and vegan options. It also has shops in France, the US, Hong Kong and several other countries. Around 90% of all Pret shops worldwide donate their unsold fresh food to local charities, giving more than 16,000 sandwiches, wraps, salads and baguettes every day to homeless shelters and charities.

History

First Pret A Manger restaurant
Jeffrey Hyman founded the first Pret A Manger in London on 21 October 1983. The first shop opened in Hampstead, London, in 1984. The name Prêt à Manger (ready to eat ) was based on prêt-à-porter, French for "ready-to-wear" clothing.

Opening in June 1983, the company traded at 58 Hampstead High Street for 18 months at which time takings had dropped to below break-even point and the company went into liquidation. The name and visual branding was purchased from the company liquidator David Rubin by two university friends, Sinclair Beecham and Julian Metcalfe.

Pret A Manger, 1986 onwards
Beecham and Metcalfe started a new operation, using the Pret A Manger name purchased from the former company's liquidator. They opened their first Pret A Manger in July 1986, located at 75b Victoria Street in London. They developed the chain's menu of handmade natural food, prepared in shop kitchens, and remained significant shareholders.

In 1995, Metcalfe and Beecham set up The Pret Foundation, to help alleviate poverty in the UK. The Pret Foundation received donations from collection boxes in shops, funding a fleet of electric vans that deliver unsold food to homeless shelters at the end of each day, including FareShare, The Felix Project and City Harvest. The Pret Foundation has awarded over £7 million to over 100 charities across the UK, tackling homelessness, hunger and poverty.

The first shop outside London was opened on Broad Street, New York, in 2000, and by 2016, there were 74 Pret shops across the United States. In 2001, McDonald's bought a 33% non-controlling stake in the company, which they sold in 2008 to the private equity firm Bridgepoint Capital.

In 2008, Pret A Manger's charitable foundation, The Pret Foundation, launched its "Rising Stars" programme, which supports people at risk of homelessness, including former prisoners and refugees, with sustainable employment in Pret shops, training, free travel, gift-cards to buy new clothes and peer-to-peer weekly support groups. As of 2022, over 600 people have joined Rising Stars, with 80% completing the 12-week programme. Some "Rising Stars" have gone on to become shop managers, or have been recruited to Pret's head office in London, known as "75B". 50p from every sandwich on its Christmas menu, 50p from Pret's "Hog Roast Mac n Cheese" and 10p from every soup goes to The Pret Foundation.

Pret A Manger opened its first shop in France in 2012 and had 51 shops in France by 2022.

In June 2016, after running an online poll, Pret a Manger opened a vegan and vegetarian branch in Soho, London, under a new brand name, Veggie Pret, changing its Twitter page for the launch from burgundy to green. "We opened our Veggie Pret pop up as an experiment," Pret's group chief executive at the time Clive Schlee wrote in a blog post, "never imagining it would be around for more than a month. We ended up making it permanent..."

In 2016, Pret's group sales were £776 million.

In April 2017, the company opened its second Veggie Pret in Shoreditch, East London.

In September 2018, JAB Holding Company acquired Pret a Manger from Bridgepoint.

In May 2019, Pret bought rival chain Eat for an undisclosed sum, originally planning to convert many branches into Veggie Pret shops.

On 27 August 2020, during the 2020 coronavirus pandemic in the UK, the company announced that it would cut 2,890 jobs from its UK workforce (more than a third of the current employees). The primary reason given was a severe downturn in trade. Most jobs would be lost from shops, with 90 roles lost in the company support centre.

In April 2022, the company announced plans to enter the Irish market, opening 20 outlets and creating 500 jobs.

In 2022, Israeli retailer Fox announced plans to open over 40 Pret A Manger outlets in Israel.

Restaurants

The company emphasises the use of natural ingredients and advertises that its sandwiches are made on the day of purchase in a kitchen at each location (with the stated exception of a few small outlets). Food left unsold at the end of the day is collected by charities. Sandwiches are packaged in paperboard rather than sealed plastic. 67% of its trade is in London, where around three-quarters of its stores are located. Locations include:

United Kingdom
United Arab Emirates: 1 outlet, as of March 2016. It opened on 16 March 2016 at Dubai International Airport's new Concourse D.
United States: 64
Hong Kong
China
Singapore
Belgium
France
Denmark: 3 at Copenhagen Airport in Terminal 3, Terminal 2 and Gate A
Germany: 1 at Berlin Hauptbahnhof and 1 in Frankfurt at Fressgass (Große Bockenheimer Strasse 46)
Switzerland: 3 at Zurich Airport and 1 at Geneva Cornavin railway station
Ireland (2022): 1 at Dublin's Dawson Street, 1 planned for Harcourt Street
India (2022)
Canada (2022): Toronto, Vancouver
Kuwait (2022): 1 at Al Hamra Tower, Sharq
Luxembourg (2022): Luxembourg-City, Royal-Hamilius

Organisation

In 1998, the company employed 1,400 people, of whom 19% were from the UK and 60% were from other European Union countries, mainly in Eastern Europe. Pret a Manger employs 1 in every 14 applicants. Applicants go on a one-day experience day at a shop and their success is determined by votes from the staff members. Many managers and senior executives have come from within the company.

The organisational structure of Pret a Manger is divided between its stores and the main offices. The London head office is the hub for the UK stores, while the office in New York City is the hub for the American stores. Each store contains levels of positions that range from team member to general manager of the store. Above the in-store manager is the operations manager who is in charge of a group of roughly 10 stores, and above that are more senior management positions based out of the offices that are tasked with coordinating a region and maintaining communication with the company's CEO in London. All office employees are paired with a "buddy shop" where they work at least two days a year.

While the uppermost levels of management are located in the offices, not all the office jobs are above the store jobs in the organisational structure. Orders do not strictly flow from the head offices in a top-down manner; instead, the channel of communication between the executives and the stores is open in both directions.

Pret a Manger promotes an internal culture as described in a leaflet entitled "Pret Behaviours". The Behaviours break down traits into three categories: passion, clear talking and team working – and identify specific behaviours as "Don't want to see", "Want to see", and "Pret perfect!" The number of Behaviours Pret hopes an employee exhibits increases with rank within the company: team members should practise around six Behaviours, managers ten, and the company's executives all of them.

Controversies

Affective labour issues
Pret a Manger has been cited as being particularly vigorous in extracting affective labour from its employees. Affective labour (or emotional labour) is work which involves manipulating a person's emotional state.

Pret a Manger demands go beyond traditional requirements for fast-food workers (such as courtesy, efficiency, and reliability) to such tasks as having "presence", demonstrating a quirky sense of fun, and exhibiting behaviour consistent with being inwardly happy with oneself. Pret a Manger uses mystery shoppers to ensure that employees deploy markers of a positive emotional state. Employees who exhibit markers of latent sadness face consequences such as not having a bonus. This has led to some criticism of the company for over-reaching while drawing praise from some commentators and other business owners for its business practices.

Pret a Manger Staff Union
In response to labour issues within the company, the Pret a Manger Staff Union was established in 2012 as an independent union with its principal demand being made around calls for a Living Wage. Andrej Stopa, the founder of the union, was later sacked from his Pret branch.

Failure to list ingredients on packaging
In late 2015, a 17-year-old girl collapsed and needed emergency medical care after a "life-threatening" reaction to sesame, which was present in a Pret product despite an absence of suitable allergen labelling on the packaging. The girl's mother, a doctor, contacted Pret a Manger and was told the allergen was not mentioned on the product, so she cautioned them that "other serious adverse incidents could easily occur". A woman almost died following a reaction to a baguette in October 2015, despite the patient's family warning Pret A Manger the firm did not label products with allergy information.

In July 2016, 15-year-old Natasha Ednan-Laperouse died from an allergic reaction to sesame after eating a Pret sandwich, the packaging of which did not list sesame as an ingredient, but which nevertheless contained some. Nadim Ednan-Laperouse, the girl's father, said, "When my mother called and told me that the baguette contained sesame, I was taken aback ... I was completely horrified. It was their fault ... I was stunned that a big food company like Pret could mislabel a sandwich and this could cause my daughter to die." The lawyer for the family said a photograph, taken at the store eight days after the girl's death, indicated no sticker warning concerning allergens was on the packages. The coroner said the labelling was inadequate.

In 2017, 42-year-old Celia Marsh died from an allergic reaction to Pret a Manger products. A product, claimed by Pret to be dairy-free, contained traces of dairy. Pret a Manger blamed a supplier. The supplier, CoYo, disputed the allegation and maintains Pret a Manger hampered its investigations by refusing to reveal the batch number of the affected product.

Notes and references

External links

Pret A Manger - US site

1986 establishments in England
British companies established in 1986
Restaurants established in 1986
British brands
Coffeehouses and cafés in the United Kingdom
Fast-food chains of the United Kingdom
Sandwich restaurants
2018 mergers and acquisitions
British subsidiaries of foreign companies
Companies based in London
Restaurants in London